Blackening, Blackened, or Blacken may refer to:

Entertainment
 "Blackened", a 1988 Metallica song from ...And Justice for All (album)
 The Blackening, a 2007 album by thrash metal band Machine Head
 The Blackening (film), a 2022 comedy directed by Tim Story

Places
 Blacken (basin), under Lake Mälaren, Sweden

Other uses
 Blackening (chemistry) or black oxide, a conversion coating for ferrous materials
 Blackening (cooking), a cooking technique commonly used in the preparation of fish
 Blackening (Scottish wedding custom), performed in the days or weeks prior to marriages in Scotland

See also
 Blakeney (disambiguation)
 Darkening (disambiguation)
 Dyeing
 Hair colouring
 Shadow
 Shade (colour)
 Shade (shadow)
 Shadowing (disambiguation)